Kuffner or Küffner may refer to:
 Kuffner (surname)
 12568 Kuffner (1998 VB5), a Main-belt Asteroid discovered in 1998
 Kuffner observatory, one of two telescope-equipped public observatories situated in Austria's capital, Vienna
 Palais Kuffner, city-palace in Vienna that was built for the brewery barons von Kuffner

de:Küffner